Desire, also known as Beyond Desire, is a 2002 Spanish romantic drama film directed by Gerardo Vera from a screenplay by Ángeles Caso which stars Leonor Watling and Leonardo Sbaraglia.

Plot 
Set in Madrid in 1945, during the Francoist dictatorship, the plot follows the impossible romance between Elvira and Pablo. Elvira is a  humble woman with allegiances to those vanquished in the Spanish Civil War (her father shot dead by the fascists and her husband Julio imprisoned) living with her sister Raquel and her mother. Pablo is an Argentine businessman of German descent and Nazi allegiances who is helping Nazis to flee to Argentina.

Cast

Production 
The screenplay was penned by novel screenwriter Ángeles Caso. The score was authored by Stephen Warbeck, whereas Javier Aguirresarobe worked as cinematographer. The bulk of the footage was shot in Madrid, with some scenes filmed in Galicia.

Release 
Distributed by Lolafilms Distribución, the film was theatrically released in Spain on 25 October 2002.

Reception 
Jonathan Holland of Variety considered that the "good-looking political romancer" features a "solid script", which "sidesteps the obvious pitfalls, and the luminous screen presence of Leonor Watling suffuses the whole with warmth and tenderness".

Ángel Fernández-Santos of El País considered that despite a good start and a compelling exterior sketch of the characters, the two leads and their romance end up losing steam, "bound by the corset of two inert, empty, dead characters".

See also 
 List of Spanish films of 2002

References 

2002 romantic drama films
Spanish historical drama films
Spanish romantic drama films
2000s Spanish films
2000s Spanish-language films
Films shot in Madrid
Films set in Madrid
Films set in 1945
Aftermath of World War II in popular culture
LolaFilms films
Films directed by Gerardo Vera